Marble is an unincorporated community in Stevens County, in the U.S. state of Washington.

History
A post office called Marble was established in 1897, and remained in operation until 1943. The community was named for marble near the original town site.

In the early 1990s, Barry and Ann Byrd founded the Marble Fellowship Community Church in the then-ghost town of Marble. It attracted newcomers from around the western United States. Residents were concerned that the newcomers at Marble were part of a cult. The church is associated with Christian Identity, an interpretation of Christianity considered by the Southern Poverty Law Center to be racist, anti-Semitic and white nationalist. The church's annual God and Country Celebration attracts influential figures from the radical right, many with clear ties to racist, anti-Semitic and white nationalist groups from the local, state and national levels.

References

Unincorporated communities in Stevens County, Washington
Unincorporated communities in Washington (state)